Jacqueline deWit (September 26, 1912 – January 7, 1998) was an American film and TV character actress from Los Angeles who appeared in over two dozen films, including Spellbound (1945), The Snake Pit, The Damned Don't Cry!, Tea and Sympathy, All That Heaven Allows and Harper. She also appeared in the 1946 Abbott and Costello comedy Little Giant, as Bud Abbott's wife.

Career
She made numerous appearances on TV series such as Wagon Train, The Lineup, The Monkees, and most notably, in the iconic 1959 The Twilight Zone episode "Time Enough at Last", in which she played the nagging wife of the lead character played by Burgess Meredith.

DeWit's Broadway credits include The Taming of the Shrew in 1935. On radio, she portrayed Ruth Thompson on Meet Mr. McNultey and Valerie on Second Husband. She reprised the Thompson role on The Ray Milland Show, the TV version of Meet Mr. McNultey.

Personal life and demise
DeWit died in Los Angeles on January 7, 1998, at age 85. She was cremated and returned to her family in residence.

Partial filmography

 The Leopard Man (1943) - Helene (uncredited)
 Dragon Seed (1944) - Wu Lien's Wife
 Black Magic (1944) - Justine Bonner
 Moonlight and Cactus (1944) - Elsie
 Fog Island (1945) - Emiline Bronson
 I'll Remember April (1945) - Whisper
 Swing Out, Sister (1945) - Pat Cameron
 Lady on a Train (1945) - Miss Fletcher
 Men in Her Diary (1945) - Marjorie Barnes
 That Night with You (1945) - Blossom Drake
 Week-End at the Waldorf (1945) - Kate Douglas
 Spellbound (1945) - Nurse (uncredited)
 Saratoga Trunk (1945) - Guilia Forosini
 Little Giant (1946) - Hazel Temple Morrison
 She Wrote the Book (1946) - Millicent Van Cleve
 Cuban Pete (1946) - Lindsay
 Wild Beauty (1946) - Cissy Cruthers
 The Lone Wolf in Mexico (1947) - Liliane Dumont
 Something in the Wind (1947) - Fashion Show Saleslady
 The Snake Pit (1948) - Celia Sommerville
 It's a Great Feeling (1949) - Trent's Secretary (uncredited)
 Chinatown at Midnight (1949) - Lisa Marcel
 The Damned Don't Cry (1950) - Sandra
 The Happy Years (1950) - Mrs. Cameron (uncredited)
 The Great Jewel Robber (1950) - Mrs. Arthur Vinson
 On the Isle of Samoa (1950) - Mrs. Marguerite Leach
 Never a Dull Moment (1950) - Myra Van Elson (uncredited)
 The First Legion (1951) - Miss Hamilton
 Carrie (1952) - Carrie's Sister Minnie
 She's Back on Broadway (1953) - Lisa Kramer
 Playgirl (1954) - Greta Marsh
 The Shrike (1955) - Katherine Meade
 Lay That Rifle Down (1955) - Aunt Sarah Greeb
 All That Heaven Allows (1955) - Mona Plash
 The Toy Tiger (1956) - Edna
 Tea and Sympathy (1956) - Lilly Sears
 Pocketful of Miracles (1961) - Louise - Governor's Wife (uncredited)
 It Happened at the World's Fair (1963) - Emma Johnson (uncredited)
 Twice-Told Tales (1963) - Hannah Pyncheon, Gerald's Sister
 Harper (1966) - Mrs. Kronberg

References

External links

 
 

1912 births
1998 deaths
20th-century American actresses
Actresses from Los Angeles
American people of Dutch descent